A Shī‘ī–Sunnī Dialogue, also translated as The Right Path, is a book written by the Lebanese Shī‘ī cleric and religious authority ‘Abdul-Ḥusayn Sharaf ad-Dīn al-Mūsawī in Arabic as al-Murāja‘āt (Arabic: المراجعات), then it has been translated to more than ten languages including English.

According to the author, he visited Egypt on 1913, and met Salīm al-Bishrī, who was the head of al-Azhar University, and had long discussions with him regarding controversial issues between Shī‘īs and Sunnīs. The outcome of their discussions and long correspondence resulted in this book, which is highly recognized and circulated among Shī‘īs.

Format

The book takes the form of a collection of a series of written communications between ‘Abdul-Ḥusayn Sharaf ad-Dīn al-Mūsawī (signing with the first letter of his name 'Sh') and Salīm al-Bishrī (signing with the letter 'S') (the letters sh and s also possibly allude to the Shī‘ī–Sunnī nature of the dialogue).

Criticism 
The book has been thoroughly criticised by Sunnī Muslims, such as in the book Shattering the Mirage: A Response to ‘Abdul-Ḥusayn Sharaf ad-Dīn al-Mūsawī’s al-Murāja‘āt.

Editions
It is translated from the Arabic by Yasin T. al-Jibouri and published in May 1994 by the Imam Husayn (as) Islamic Foundation, Beirut, Lebanon.
Ansariyan Publications published it in 2001 then in 2005 then in 2008 
World Federation of KSI Muslim Communities

See also
Peshawar Nights

References

External links
Full text  on Al-islam.org
Full text on najaf.org

Shia literature
Shia theology books
Shia bibliography